A gustnado is a brief, shallow surface-based vortex which forms within the downburst emanating from a thunderstorm. The name is a portmanteau by elision of "gust front tornado", as gustnadoes form due to non-tornadic straight-line wind features in the downdraft (outflow), specifically within the gust front of strong thunderstorms. Gustnadoes tend to be noticed when the vortices loft sufficient debris or form condensation cloud to be visible although it is the wind that makes the gustnado, similarly to tornadoes. As these eddies very rarely connect from the surface to the cloud base, they are very rarely considered as tornadoes. The gustnado has little in common with tornadoes structurally or dynamically in regard to vertical development, intensity, longevity, or formative process—as classic tornadoes are associated with mesocyclones within the inflow (updraft) of the storm, not the outflow.
 
The average gustnado lasts a few seconds to a few minutes, although there can be several generations and simultaneous swarms. Most have the winds equivalent to an F0 or F1 tornado (up to ), and are commonly mistaken for tornadoes. However, unlike tornadoes, the rotating column of air in a gustnado usually does not extend all the way to the base of the thundercloud. Gustnadoes actually have more in common with (minor) whirlwinds. They are not considered true tornadoes (unless they connect the surface to the ambient cloud base in which case they'd become a landspout) by most meteorologists and are not included in tornado statistics in most areas. Sometimes referred to as spin-up tornadoes, that term more correctly describes the rare tornadic gustnado that connects the surface to the ambient clouded base, or more commonly to the relatively brief but true tornadoes that are associated with a mesovortex.

The most common setting for a gustnado is along the gust front of a severe thunderstorm (by many definitions, containing wind speeds of at least ), along which horizontal shear of the wind may be large. A particularly common location is along the rear-flank gust front of supercell storms. Gustnadoes probably form owing to shear instability associated with the strong horizontal shear; a relative maximum in vertical vorticity must exist in order for shear instability to be present. The bigger question is probably what the dynamical origin(s) of the vertical vorticity is (are), such as the tilting of horizontal vorticity into the vertical or vertical vorticity in the ambient environment that preexists the storm.  Along the rear-flank gust front of supercell storms, vertical vorticity very likely has its origins in the upward tilting of vorticity that can occur within descending air in the presence of baroclinity.

While injuries or deaths are rare from gustnadoes, strong ones can cause damage and they are hazardous to drivers. There is some speculation that a gustnado might have been responsible for the collapse of a stage at the Indiana State Fair on August 13, 2011 which killed 7 people and injured 58.

See also 
 Dust devil, whirlwinds that form due to superheated surface layers and stretched vorticity, most commonly on sunny, warm days with light winds
 Fujita scale
 Landspout
 Waterspout

References

External links 

 Storm Spotters' Handbook: Tornadoes and Other Funnels (Australian Bureau of Meteorology)
 NOAA/NWS Glossary

Severe weather and convection
Tornado

fr:Tornade#Gustnado